Gianfranco Mantelli (born 17 May 1947) is an Italian sports shooter. He competed at the 1976 Summer Olympics and the 1980 Summer Olympics.

References

1947 births
Living people
Italian male sport shooters
Olympic shooters of Italy
Shooters at the 1976 Summer Olympics
Shooters at the 1980 Summer Olympics
Sportspeople from Rome
20th-century Italian people